Grand Rapids is found  from the mouth of the Athabasca River, Alberta, Canada.

The rapids are found on both sides of an island in the river. In the channel is an island, where the Hudson's Bay Company built a tramway to transport the outfits for all the northern posts.

"In 1989, the Athabasca River was designated a Canadian Heritage River for its importance to the fur trade and the construction of railways and roads opening up the Canadian West, as well as for its natural heritage."

Grand Rapids Wildland Provincial Park in the Rapids Reach of the Athabasca River upstream from Ft. McMurray is a critical moose wintering range. Scenic, with "numerous rapids, rock outcrops and slump blocks...the river is deeply incised for the entire length of the park, in places exceeding 150 metres." The historic portage route has been restored.

An 1893 geological survey was published as a report of the expedition titled Report on the Doobaunt, Kazan and Ferguson Rivers.

References

External links
 

Athabasca, Alberta
Waterfalls of Alberta
 Rapids of Canada
 Hudson's Bay Company trading posts
 Trading posts in Canada
 1880s in Alberta
 Portages in Canada
 Trade routes
 Canadian Heritage Rivers
 1890s in Alberta
 1900s in Alberta
 1910s in Alberta
Regional Municipality of Wood Buffalo